Phil Moore (February 20, 1918 – May 13, 1987) was an American jazz pianist, arranger, and bandleader.

Biography
Moore was orphaned and placed in a county hospital in Portland, Oregon. He attended the Cornish School and the University of Washington in Seattle.  When Moore was 13, he played piano at speakeasies and small venues in Portland.

In 1937 He married Neva Mary Peoples; a pianist, actress and a vocalist of San Francisco, Ca. He supported Lena Horne, Frank Sinatra, Bobby Short, Marshal Royal, Irving Ashby, Julie Wilson, Gene Sedric, Les Hite, and Helen Gallagher. He arranged big-band music for the Tommy Dorsey and Harry James orchestras.

In 1946, he played the role of a band leader in a short B movie, Stars on Parade.  About this time, his relationship with Dorothy Dandridge helped bring her success in a nightclub singing career. Moore served as vocal coach for other performers in Hollywood, including Marilyn Monroe and Ava Gardner.

Phil Moore worked at MGM and Paramount studios as an arranger. He worked on scores for over 30 films, although rarely received a screen credit; it has been speculated that this was due to his race.  These included Ziegfeld Girl, Dumbo, Three Cheers for the Boys, Panama Hattie, Presenting Lily Mars, Cabin in the Sky, the 1944 production of Kismet, and This Gun for Hire.

During the late 1940s, Moore toured with his group, the Phil Moore Four: Milt Hinton (bass), Marty Wilson (drums), Johnny Letman (trumpet), and Jimmy Lyons (saxophone or guitar). He recorded for RCA Victor [with Doles Dickens (bass), Walter Bishop (drums), Edward Leroy Gibbs (guitar), and Remo Palmieri (electric guitar)], Musicraft [w/Doles Dickens or John Levy (bass), Walter Bishop (drums), unknown (guitar), and Johnny Letman (trumpet)], and Black & White Records [w/Billy Hadnott (bass), Lee Young (drums), and Irving Ashby (electric guitar)] during this time.

He was a movie industry vocal and stagecraft grooming coach in the early careers of many, most notably Dorothy Dandridge and Marilyn Monroe. From the late 1950s he gained, and maintained until his death, a wide commercial reputation in the grooming and coaching of aspiring black and white singers, starting a school in New York named "For Singers Only."

In 1953, he recorded two bebop Christmas songs for RCA Victor — "Blink Before Christmas" and "Chinchy Old Scrooge".  Created in the heyday of the "beat" era, these songs were thick with 1950s hipster slang, in the style of jazz-based pre-rap songs.  This recording has become a rare collector's item.

Moore died on May 13, 1987 in Los Angeles, California, aged 69.

Discography

As leader
 Dance and Dream with Phil Moore at the Piano, Volume 1 (Black & White, 1946) – 78rpm 4-disc album set.
 Eventide: Phil Moore Orchestra (Discovery, 1949) – 10" LP.
 Reminiscing: Phil Moore at the Piano (Discovery, 1949) – 10" LP.
 Music for Moderns (Clef, recorded 1947, released 195?)
 Fantasy for Girl and Orchestra (Verve, recorded 1947, released 1956)
 Portrait of Leda [w/Leda Annest] (Columbia, 1958)
 Polynesian Paradise (Strand, 1959)
 Moore's Tour: An American in England (MGM, 1959)
 New York Sweet (Mercury, 1963)

As sideman
With Gil Fuller
Gil Fuller & the Monterey Jazz Festival Orchestra featuring Dizzy Gillespie (Pacific Jazz #PJ-93, 1965)

References

External links

1918 births
1987 deaths
Jazz musicians from New Orleans
University of Washington alumni
Musicians from Portland, Oregon
20th-century American musicians
Discovery Records artists
20th-century African-American musicians